Bicentennial Park is an urban park in Oklahoma City, in the U.S. state of Oklahoma. The park is located east of Civic Center Music Hall, and is bordered by Couch Drive on the north, Colcord Drive on the south, and Walker Avenue on the east.

Features
The Bicentennial Monument, and the sculptures Run of 1889 and The Conductor, are installed in the park.

The statue of Stanley Draper used to be installed in the park, before being relocated outside City Hall.

History
In 2016, following the election of President Donald Trump, approximately 100 people gathered at Bicentennial Park for the "Nonviolent Protest of Trump and a Rally for Peace and Love".

The Festival of the Arts has been held in the park, as has the music event "Wiggle Out Loud".

References

External links

 Bicentennial Park at Civic Center Music Hall

Geography of Oklahoma City
Parks in Oklahoma
Urban public parks